Bilateral relations exist between Australia and Iran. Australia has maintained a continuous diplomatic presence in Iran since the Australian Embassy in Tehran was established in 1968. Iran has had an embassy in Canberra  since September 1971.

Australia, like most Western countries, has expressed concerns about Iran's human-rights record and its nuclear-weapons program.

According to the 2004 census, 18,798 people in Australia claim to be of Iranian ancestry. It is estimated that 25,000 people of Iranian descent live in Australia, most of whom came after the 1979 Iranian Revolution.

Trade and sanctions
In October 2008, Australia imposed sanctions against Iran because of Iran's nuclear program and missile program and efforts to contravene United Nations Security Council sanctions. These sanctions were applied to gold, precious metals, and arms.

In July 2010, Australia imposed financial sanctions and travel bans on individuals and entities involved in Iran's nuclear and missile programs or who assist Iran in violating sanctions, and an arms embargo. As of 2011, the two-way trade, which had diminished in recent years, was still $200 million.

Australia imposed further sanctions in January 2013 to limit Australian business with oil, gas, petroleum and financial sectors in Iran. Foreign Minister of Australia Bob Carr said "These sanctions further increase pressure on Iran to comply with its nuclear non-proliferation obligations and with UN Security Council resolutions and to engage in serious negotiations on its nuclear program".

In 2014-15, the two-way trade was more than $354 million. Most international sanctions on Iran were lifted in 2016, following the implementation of the Joint Comprehensive Plan of Action nuclear deal.

Diplomatic relations
Australian envoys attended the Non-Aligned Movement Summit in Tehran, Iran in August 2012.

On 18 April 2015, Australia's Minister for Foreign Affairs Julie Bishop visited Iran, at the invitation of Iranian Foreign Minister Mohammad Javad Zarif. The visit was the first visit of an Australian minister since Alexander Downer in 2003. During a private meeting, the Ministers discussed Australia wanting Iran to accept Iranian asylum seekers denied entry to Australia, trade between the two nations and the fight against Islamic State. Leaders were also optimistic that lifting of global sanctions on Iran would boost business opportunities for Australia and economic activity in Iran.

See also

 Foreign relations of Australia
 Foreign relations of Iran
 List of ambassadors of Australia to Iran
 List of ambassadors of Iran to Australia

References

 
Bilateral relations of Iran
Iran